Keith Kirchoff is a pianist, composer, conductor, concert curator, and music teacher who has performed in the United States and Europe. He has degrees from the New England Conservatory and the University of Oregon. Kirchoff performed over 100 new works and has performed the Boston premiere of Charles Ives's Emerson Concerto and the world premiere of Matthew McConnell's Concerto for Toy Piano.

Awards 
He has won many awards including:
  The 2006 Steinway Society Piano Competition 
  The 2005 John Cage Award 
  The Silver Lake International Piano Concerto Competition 
  The Saint Paul Piano Teachers Association Competition

References

Year of birth missing (living people)
Living people
American classical pianists
American conductors (music)
American classical composers